The Theosophical Society of New York was a theosophical organization, that separated in 1899 from the Theosophical Society in America. It is not to be confused with "The New York Theosophical Society" founded in 1875, which is today a lodge of the American section of the Theosophical Society Adyar.

In 1895 the Theosophical Society was divided into the TG Adyar (with Henry Steel Olcott) and the TG in America (with William Quan Judge). After Judge's death, Tingley was elected in a controversial election as president of the TG in America. The Theosophical Society of New York separated itself from the TG in America as a result of these controversies.

The TS of New York was founded by J.H. Salisbury und Donald Nicholson, both friends of W.Q. Judge.

The organization published the journal "The Word", editor of the journal was Harold W. Percival (1868–1953).

Literature
 Harold W. Percival: Adepts, masters, and mahatmas: The Word Foundation, Dallas 1993; 
 Harold W. Percival: Thinking and Destiny: The Word Foundation, Dallas 1993;

External links
 The Word Foundation
 Theosophy 1875-1925
  Theosophy 1875-1950

Theosophical Society